Thomas Owen Marsh (born December 27, 1965) is an American former Major League Baseball player. Marsh played high school baseball at Woodward High School in Toledo. He played college baseball at the University of Toledo from 1985 to 1988. He was drafted by Philadelphia in the 16th round of the 1988 MLB draft and made his Major League Baseball debut in 1992 for the Philadelphia Phillies. Marsh only played for parts of three seasons in MLB baseball — all with the Phillies — in 1992, 1994, and 1995. He was involved in a serious on-field injury during a game in 1995. Due to the seriousness of the matter, ESPNs Baseball Tonight devoted much of its program that evening to Marsh's injury.

External links

Tom Marsh at SABR (Baseball BioProject)

Philadelphia Phillies players
Baseball players from Ohio
Sportspeople from Toledo, Ohio
1965 births
Living people
Águilas Cibaeñas players
American expatriate baseball players in the Dominican Republic
Toledo Rockets baseball players
Madison Black Wolf players
Batavia Clippers players
Buffalo Bisons (minor league) players
Clearwater Phillies players
Reading Phillies players
Scranton/Wilkes-Barre Red Barons players
Spartanburg Phillies players